George Arthur Miller (6 December 1867 – 21 February 1935), was a British polo player who competed in the 1908 Summer Olympics as a member of the British polo team Roehampton, which won the gold medal.

Miller was educated at Marlborough College and Trinity College, Cambridge.

References

External links
profile

1867 births
1935 deaths
English polo players
English Olympic medallists
Polo players at the 1908 Summer Olympics
Olympic polo players of Great Britain
Olympic gold medallists for Great Britain
Alumni of Trinity College, Cambridge
International Polo Cup
Medalists at the 1908 Summer Olympics
Olympic medalists in polo